A wyvern or wivern is a two-legged dragon often represented in heraldry.

Wyvern or wivern can also refer to:

Entertainment
Radio Wyvern, a UK radio station now known as Free Radio Herefordshire & Worcestershire
Wyvern (film), a Sci Fi Pictures original film
The Wyvern Mystery, a 2000 BBC TV miniseries

Gaming
Eye of the Wyvern, an adventure module for Dungeons & Dragons
Wyvern (card game), a collectible card game
Wyvern (Dungeons & Dragons), wyverns as they appear in the roleplaying game Dungeons & Dragons
Wyvern (video game), created by Cabochon Technologies

People
Wyvern, the pen-name of Arthur Robert Kenney-Herbert
Wyvern Lingo, an Irish band

Places
Wyvern, Nova Scotia, a community in Canada
Wyvern Academy, a secondary school in Darlington, County Durham, England
Wyvern Barracks, a military installation in Exeter, Devon, England
Wyvern College, the name of two colleges in England
Wyvern House, a day school in Sydney, New South Wales, Australia
Wyvern Theatre, in Swindon, Wiltshire, England
”Wyvern School”, C.S. Lewis’ pseudonym for Wynyard School, the public school he attended

Sports
Passlab Yamagata Wyverns, a professional basketball team in Japan
SK Wyverns, an obsolete team name in Korean professional baseball
Wiltshire Wyverns, a rugby league based in Corsham, Wiltshire, England

Transportation
, the name of more than one ship of the British Royal Navy
TSS Wyvern (1905), a passenger vessel in the United Kingdom
Vauxhall Wyvern, a four-door saloon car that was manufactured from 1948 to 1957
Westland Wyvern, a British turboprop fighter aircraft
Wyvern (vessel), Norwegian sailboat that is part of Stavanger Maritime Museum
Wyvern Light Car, a defunct British automobile manufacturer
WyvernRail, a community-owned venture within the Ecclesbourne Valley Railway in Derbyshire, England
X-02 Wyvern, a fictional plane in the Ace Combat series of video games

Other
Acianthera wyvern, a species of orchid plant native to Colombia
Wyvern (programming language), a programming language for mobile and web applications
 Wyvern inc., a Canadian earth observation company.